Linden High School may refer to:

Linden High School (Alabama)
Linden High School (California)
Linden High School (Linden, Wisconsin), listed on the NRHP in Iowa County, Wisconsin
Linden High School (Michigan)
Linden High School (New Jersey)

See also
 Linden-McKinley High School, Columbus, Ohio
 Linden School (disambiguation)
 Lynden High School, Washington
 Lyndon School (disambiguation)